Rashang one of the beautiful village in Allai Valley, Union Council Head Quarter, one of the 08 Union Councils in Allai sub division and 20th in Battagram District of Khyber-Pakhtunkhwa.
 It is located at 34°49'10N 73°7'30E and has an altitude of 1970 metres (6466 feet).

References

Union councils of Battagram District
Populated places in Battagram District